Al-Hujariah also known as the Islamic Mikhlaf al-Maʿafir, al-Maʿafir region and Mapharitis (Μαφαρῖτις) is a region in Yemen. Most of the region is located inside Taiz Governorate and some of it is located in Lahj Governorate. It includes al-Qabitah District, al-Ma'afer District, Jabal Habashi District, al Maqatirah District, ash-Shamaytan District, as-Silw District, al-Wazi'iyah District and al-Mawasit District. Its most notable archaeological sites are Dolmolwah castle, Ibn al-Moghalis castle, Sodan castle (today is known as al-Maqatirah castle), Jabal Thokhr castle, Kharbat Saloq and its most notable mountains are Haifan mountains, Yousifeen mountains, al-A'rooq mountains and Hisn al-Samdan.

History 

Al-Maʿafir is a Himyarite tribe. Al-Maʿafir region is mentioned in Greek sources as Mapharitis. According to Greek sources, the capital of Al-Maʿafir was Sawe (Σαυή) modern day Sawwa.

Ancient history

7th century BCE Sabaean campaign 

Al-Maʿafir region appears in many ancient South Arabian inscriptions. The oldest known inscription that mentions al-Maʿafir dates back to the seventh century BCE. The inscription is part of an inscription called Naqsh an-Nasr or Inscription of Victory (RES 3945). The inscription describes Karib'il Watar attack on the cities of al-Maʿafir during his campaign against Awsan. Karib'il Watar destroyed and burned the cities of al-Maʿafir, he killed 3000 and took 8000 prisoners.

The city of Sawa was mentioned seven times in an inscription that dates back to the time of Il Sharh Yahdhib and Yazl Bayan. Another city of al-Maʿafir called Dhabhan Dhi Hamram was also mentioned in the South Arabian inscriptions. In a Qatabanic inscription that is known as Naqsh al-ʿUd (RES 3858), the city of Dhabhan Dhi Hamram was mentioned next to other cities, Sabir, Salman, Hamir and Hajran and a people called people of Azaz were mentioned as inhabitants of the region. The city Dhabhan Dhi Hamram is located in today's Mawiah and Khusha. Another city called Dhabhan Dhi Qashram is mentioned in South Arabian inscriptions and is located in today's Dhabhan sub-district.

The inscription of Samaʿ that is dated to the third century CE mentions the tribe of al-ʿArooq which is located in the al-Maʿafir region and their Himyarite king Shamar Yaḥamid. Another tribe and a city called al-Mashawilah that are located in the al-Maʿafir region mentioned in many inscriptions. One of the inscriptions says that the Himyarite king Dhamar Ali Yahbour the first sent one of his soldiers named Mabhal to spy on "Hajram Maswalam".

Center of the Zurayid ramp state
Dhubhan, Dimloa, Yumain & Munif were listed among the last citadels surrendered by the Zurayids to the Ayyubids in 1193.

Trade with Azania
Mofarite Merchants were historically the sole mercantile class in Azania, the prolonged presence & admixture with locals since ancient times is best represented in the Swahili language.

Invention of Coffee
Muhammad Ibn Said Al Dhobhani a 15th-century Sufi Imam, who traded goods between Yemen & Ethiopia, introduced the first coffee beans to Yemen. Within a short period coffee was exported out of Mocha and Aden to the rest of the world.

Classical sources 
The oldest mention of the al-Maʿafir region in classical sources is by Ptolemy who named it "Maforitae". Then it was mentioned in Periplus of the Erythraean Sea book, the book mentions the city of "Seua" that is located in "Mapharitis".

Islamic sources 
Al-Maʿafir was known for its cloaks and garments which were known as "Al-Maʿafiri". A Maʿafiri garment was brought to Prophet Muhammad and Abu Sufiyan said "May Allah curse this fabric and who made it" and Prophet Muhammad responded by saying "don't curse them [Maʿafiri people], I am one of them and they are part of me".

According to Islamic sources, the Himyarite king ʼAsʿad al-Kamil covered the Kaʿaba with Maʿafiri fabrics.

Al-Hugariyyah Arabic 
According to ibn Mākūlā, the reason for the similarity between the Cairene pronunciation and the Hugariyyah pronunciation could be related to a story that is narrated by Muslim historians about a group of people called al-Ruʿah (shepherds) who left the Arabian Peninsula and invaded Egypt or a rumor about a man from al-Hujariah whose name was ʿAwn (عون) who ran away to Egypt and was therefore called Far ʿAwn (Far means escaped in Arabic, Farʿawn means Pharaoh).

According to Janet C. E. Watson, the  phoneme jim is pronounced as voiced velar stop, /g/, in both the Cairene and the Hugaryyiah Arabic. This was probably the case in proto-semitic and early pre-classical Arabic.

Notable people from al-Maʿafir
Muhammad Ibn Said Al Dhobhani
Almanzor.
Abu Bakr ibn al-Arabi
Ibn Hisham
Tarif ibn Malik
Abdul Fattah Ismail

See also 
 At Turbah

References 

Populated places in Taiz Governorate